PITR may refer to:

 Point-in-time recovery, a computing term referring to the recovery of data from a state in past
 Pitr, a character in the webcomic User Friendly
 Pitrs or Pitr, spirits of departed ancestors in Hindu culture